The Bank of Sweden Tercentenary Foundation is a Swedish foundation which awards grants to individuals and research groups for research projects in science, the humanities, social sciences, medical research, technology, and law. It was created to celebrate the Bank of Sweden's 300th anniversary in 1968. The Riksbankens Jubileumsfond initiated the Cultural Policy Research Award in collaboration with the European Cultural Foundation in 2003. It is a member of the Network of European Foundations for Innovative Cooperation (NEF).

References

External links 
Official website of the Bank of Sweden Tercentenary Foundation

Grants (money)
Foundations based in Sweden
Tricentennial anniversaries